Sol, vind och vatten ("Sun, wind and water") is a song written by Swedish lyricist Kenneth Gärdestad and composer Ted Gärdestad. First recorded by Lena Andersson, the song was released as a single in October 1972. Ted Gärdestad recorded the song for his 1973 album Ted.

Context
By the second verse, the birth of Jesus is apparent, but in Sweden the song is strongly associated with the summertime and not Christmastime. Many people interpret dig "you" as a human being, and not God or Jesus.

Later during the 1970s, 1980s and early 1990s, the term Sol, vind och vatten' became associated with the issue of energy politics, with protests against nuclear power yelling:
-Vad skall väck? -Barsebäck! (-What shall be gone? -Barsebäck!)
-Vad skall in? -Sol och vind! (-What shall come in? - Sun and wind!)

A Framåt fredag version, written by Peter Sundblad and Lars Gunnar Övermyr, was also called Sol, vind & vatten, but actually had an energy political theme.

Publication
Barnens svenska sångbok, 1999, under the lines "Gladsång och poplåt"

Charts

References

1972 songs
1972 singles
Polar Music singles
Swedish-language songs
Ted Gärdestad songs
Lena Andersson songs
Songs written by Ted Gärdestad